Geldo is a municipality of Spain in the Valencian Community, in the province of Castellón. It has a population of 716 (2005) and an area of 0.50 km².

References

Municipalities in the Province of Castellón